Lukinki is a rural locality (a village) in Nikolskoye Rural Settlement, Sheksninsky District, Vologda Oblast, Russia. The population was 27 as of 2002.

Geography 
Lukinki is located 4 km southeast of Sheksna (the district's administrative centre) by road. Bolshoye Mitenino is the nearest rural locality.

References 

Rural localities in Sheksninsky District